Rudra Avtar is an epic poem under the title Ath Rudra Avtar Kathan(n) . It was written by Guru Gobind Singh. It was included in Dasam Granth Sahib, which is considered to be the second-most important scripture of the Sikhs. This composition covers the most important wars within Gurmat philosophy, such as the fight between Bibek Buddhi and Abibek Budhi, (truth and falsity), and the fight between wisdom and ignorance.

This composition covers the concepts of Gyaan (Wisdom) and Dhyana (Attention) and is against fake ritualism and practices.

Singh sanctified and narrated the life history of two souls, designating them with the title Rudra: Dattatreya - Hindu Monk and Parshvanatha - 23rd Tirthankar of Jainism.

History
This poem was written in Anandpur Sahib, probably in 1698 CE (1755 in the Vikram Samvat calendar).

This text is part of Bachittar Natak Granth, as per rubrics at the end. Although modern interpreters believe that a portion of Singh's life, which he refers to as Apni Katha is Bachittar Natak, the rest of the compositions are independent from it.

This composition is present in every early manuscript, i.e. those of Mani Singh, Motibagh, Sangrur and Patna.

The language of the composition is Hindi with a mixture of Sanskrit words.

The First six Chandds are introductory. 849 Chandds narrate Dattatreya, and 359 Chandds narrate about Paras Nath.

Unlike "Chandi Charitar" and "Krishna Avtar", the source of narration of "Rudra Avtar" does not come from the 36 Puranas.

Rudra in Sikhism 

Guru Granth Sahib covers the concept of Rudra Dhyaan. Every living being's surt/dhyaan (attention) can be directed in two ways, one towards one's body (outer world), and the other towards one's own self. As long as attention stays only on the body, connection is lost with our selves, which is incomplete (half or daal as in Gurbani). This causes tension, confusion, and poor decisions. For those who are complete (the one as in Gurbani), their attention is focused on the source of attention (self), rendering them immune to the influence of the outside world, such as vices. Such a one-mindedness and focus is called Rudra Dhyaan. From such a dhyaan, the thoughts that sprout are all under divine hukam (and are not self-conceived). Consequently, hukam itself is called Rudra.

In "Dasam Granth", Rudra and Shiva are generic terms, while Mahadev is the name of one person, whom people call Rudra or Shiva. In Gurmat philosophy, Mahadev was a Yogi who lived in the Himalayas. In Hindu myth, Mahadev is also called Shiv or Rudra, but in Gurmat philosophy, the term Shiv does not apply to Mahadev because Shiv is Nirankar (Formless). In Chopai, Singh cleared it as: . Guru Gobind Singh refers to Mahadev/Shiva in the following lines:

References 

Dasam Granth
Indian literature